KXOJ-FM (94.1 MHz) is a Christian adult contemporary radio station licensed to Glenpool, Oklahoma, serving the Tulsa area. The station is owned by Stephens Media, through licensee SMG-Tulsa, LLC.  Its studios are located at the CityPlex Towers and its transmitter is in Chandler Park in West Tulsa.  KXOJ-FM also provides a Christian CHR station known as Now 94.5, playing Christian Pop, Rock, and Hip-Hop music.

Until August 16, 2016, the then-KTSO branded itself as "The Breeze". The call letters signified a previous format, Tulsa's Soft Oldies. Prior to that format, the station was licensed to Okmulgee, Oklahoma, and aired a range of formats, including classical music. On November 22, 2012, KTSO started playing all Christmas music. KRAV was Tulsa's Official Christmas Station. The Best of the 60s, 70s & 80s returned to the airwaves on December 26, 2012.

Before August 16, 2016, KXOJ-FM was located at 100.9. Every morning between 6 and 10am KXOJ-FM's on-air lineup includes Dave Weston and Katie Rindt. Other veteran announcers included Bob Michaels, joined the station in 1998, and Gary Thompson 3pm to 7pm, who began intermittently working there in the early 1990s. After many years in morning drive, Heather Miles moved to the 10a to 3p shift in January 2016.Jeremiah St. James joined the staff as evening host in 2018.

On July 1, 2013, KTSO changed their format to adult contemporary, branded as "94.1 The Breeze".

On August 16, 2016, at Midnight, KTSO began stunting with construction noises. At 7:30 a.m. that day, KTSO flipped to KXOJ's Christian programming. At the same time as the switch, 94.1 and 100.9 switched call letters. The move allowed KXOJ to increase its broadcasting power almost 400-fold, giving it stronger coverage of the rural areas near Tulsa.

References

External links

XOJ-FM